Pomacanthus navarchus, the blue-girdled angelfish or majestic angelfish, is a marine angelfish from the Indo-Pacific region. It occasionally makes its way into the aquarium trade. P. navarchus is one of the smallest of the larger species of angelfish. Majestic angelfish eat mainly sponges and tunicates. Juvenile fish are mostly blue in color with white stripes. As they mature, they take on a yellow coloration on the flanks, dorsal fin, and tail.

Description
The body of this fish is laterally flattened. Adult fish have three main colored sections; the anterior section in front of the eyes and the front part of the body is lemon yellow; the central section is funnel-shaped and is deep blue, and the posterior section is reticulated in bright yellow and blue. The sections are separated by pale blue bands edged with black. The mouth and lips are blue as are the rays of the pectoral and anal fins, while the dorsal and caudal fins are yellow, edged with pale blue. There is a long spine on the gill cover which is used in defence. Juvenile fish are dark blue with slightly curved, white lateral stripes. The change from the juvenile to the adult coloring takes place quite abruptly, with little intermediate coloring.

Distribution and habitat
Pomacanthus navarchus is native to the tropical Indo-Pacific region, its range extending from Indonesia and the Philippines to northern and eastern Australia and Micronesia.

Ecology
Pomacanthus navarchus is territorial and is generally found alone, but occasionally in pairs or small groups. It inhabits the demersal zone, feeding on sponges, algae, tunicates, zooplankton and small invertebrates. It is a protandric hermaphrodite, starting adult life as a female and later becoming a male.

References

External links

 

navarchus
Fish of Palau
Fish described in 1831
Taxa named by Frédéric Cuvier